Towndrow is a surname. Notable people with the surname include:

 Frank Towndrow (1911–2007), Anglican priest
 Lee Towndrow, American visual artist
 Paul Towndrow (born 1978), Scottish musician